The Borrowers is a BBC TV adaptation first broadcast in 1992 on BBC2 and then later on American television station TNT.   The series is adapted from the 1952 Carnegie Medal-winning first novel and the second novel of author Mary Norton's The Borrowers series: The Borrowers and The Borrowers Afield (1955). The series stars Ian Holm, Penelope Wilton and Rebecca Callard and was directed by John Henderson. The series was named on the BFI's list of "100 Greatest British Television Programmes".

Throughout the series, every episode (except the last one) ended on a cliffhanger. The series was followed by The Return of the Borrowers which aired in 1993, also on BBC2 and TNT.

Both series follow the Clocks, a family of tiny people who are forced to flee from their home under the floorboards in an old manor into the English countryside.

Plot
The Clock Family are "borrowers," tiny people who live in the houses of regular sized "human beans" (a borrower mispronunciation of human beings).  They survive by borrowing all they need from big people and try to keep their existence secret.  The main characters are a teenage borrower girl named Arrietty and her parents, Pod and Homily. During a borrowing expedition with her father and contrary to borrower nature, Arrietty befriends a human boy named George who lives in the home and develops a friendship with him.

The tiny family, who live under the kitchen floorboards of an old manor (Chawton House in Hampshire was used for on location filming), are eventually discovered by the other humans who occupy the home and are forced to flee into the English countryside.  After finding an old boot to live in, the family befriends a fellow Borrower - a young man who goes by the name "Dreadful Spiller".  Spiller helps them find a more permanent home by reuniting them with relations who had formerly run away from the same manor after one of them was seen and eventually relocated in the caretaker's cabin on the manor's grounds.

Cast
 Ian Holm as Pod Clock
 Penelope Wilton as Homily Clock
 Rebecca Callard as Arrietty Clock
Paul Cross as George
 Daniel Newman as "Dreadful Spiller"
 Siân Phillips as Mrs. Driver
 David Ryall as Crampfurl
 Tony Haygarth as Mildeye
 Stanley Lebor as Uncle Hendreary Harpsichord
 Pamela Cundell as Aunt Lupy Harpsichord
Victoria Donovan as Eggletina Harpsichord

Awards
BAFTA Awards
1993 Best Children's Programme (Fiction) (Nominated)
1993 Best Design (Won)
Royal Television Society
1992 Best Production Design (Won)

References

External links
 
 
 The Borrowers review at Blogcritics

1992 British television series debuts
1992 British television series endings
British television shows based on children's books
Films shot at Pinewood Studios
Television series produced at Pinewood Studios
The Borrowers
British fantasy films
Television series by Working Title Television
Films directed by John Henderson (director)
1990s English-language films
1990s British films